K.L. Polytechnic, Roorkee, also known as Kanhaiya Lal Polytechnic, is an engineering college in Roorkee, Uttrakhand, India.

History
Kanhaiya Lal Polytechnic was established on 25 January 1956 by Shri Sahab Kanhaiya Lal Ji. At the time of establishment, its name was Kanhaiya Lal Technical Institute and it offered only one course: Diploma in Civil Engineering. In 1963, it was upgraded as Kanhaiya Lal Polytechnic and two other courses, three years Diploma in Mechanical (Production) Engineering and Diploma in Electrical Engineering were introduced. Later, three years Diploma in Electronics Engineering (1971), two years post-graduate Diploma in Computer Applications (1995) and three years Diploma in Mechanical (Automobile) Engineering (2008) courses were added to the course list of institute. 
Twenty students were additionally permitted to admit in second shift of each branch from 2008.

Affiliation
All the courses running in the institute are affiliated with the Uttarakhand Technical Education Board in Roorkee and All India Council For Technical Education in New Delhi. The institute is managed by a committee appointed by the state government of Uttarakhand.

Courses

Polytechnic
 Diploma in Civil Engineering 
 Diploma in Mechanical Engineering (Production) 
 Diploma in Electrical Engineering
 Diploma in Electronics Engineering 
 Diploma in Mechanical (Auto) Engineering
 Post Graduate Diploma in Computer Application

References

External links 
 Roorkee
Uttarakhand Board of Technical Education official website

Engineering colleges in Uttarakhand
Education in Roorkee
Educational institutions established in 1956
1956 establishments in Uttar Pradesh